Bubalus murrensis, also known as European water buffalo, is an extinct bovine that lived in Europe during the Pleistocene. Its closest living relatives are the wild water buffalo (Bubalus arnee), the tamaraw (Bubalus mindorensis), the lowland anoa (Bubalus depressicornis), the mountain anoa (Bubalus quarlesi) and the domestic water buffalo (Bubalus bubalis). A 2021 study of the DNA of current European buffalo herds showed that there was some interbreeding with the domestic water buffalo before it finally became extinct.

Description 
The morphology of Bubalus murrensis is very similar to other Bubalus species like the Wild Asian water buffalo (Bubalus arnee). Only the skull differs from other bovines, especially the triangular horns. A skull found in Rhineland-Palatinate (Germany) had a width of 107 cm.

Distribution and habitat 
The European water buffalo occurred in river valleys. Remains are very rare. The majority of finds have come from along the Rhine, Elbe and Murr in Germany and the Netherlands. Isolated specimens have also been found between the Atlantic coast of France in the west and the central part of the East European Plain in the east (a superbly preserved Allerød-aged skull from Moscow Oblast, near Kolomna). It lived in muddy and swampy terrain. Bubalus murrensis could not tolerate long-lasting episodes of frost and was therefore absent in Central Europe during the glacial periods. During the interglacial periods like the Eemian it occurred together with other species of the interglacial faunal assemblage, including the straight-tusked elephant (Palaeoloxodon antiquus), Merck's rhinoceros (Stephanorhinus kirchbergensis), fallow deer (Dama dama), aurochs (Bos primigenius) and the European hippopotamus (Hippopotamus antiquus). Fossils are known from the latest Pleistocene near Kolomna, Russia around 11,000 years old, suggesting that the European water buffalo persisted on the Pontic–Caspian steppe during cold glacial periods.

See also
 Italian Mediterranean buffalo

References

Bovines
Fossil taxa described in 1927
Cenozoic mammals of Europe